Catherine Nevin (1 October 1950 – 19 February 2018) was an Irish woman who was convicted in 2000 of murdering her husband Tom Nevin at Jack White's Inn, a pub owned by the couple in County Wicklow. The jury in her trial also found her guilty on three charges of soliciting others to kill him after five days of deliberation, then the longest period of deliberation in the history of the Irish State. She was subsequently dubbed the Black Widow by the press. Nevin was the subject of significant coverage by the tabloid press and Justice Mella Carroll ordered a ban on the press commenting on Nevin's appearance or demeanour during the trial.

Early life 
Catherine Scully  met Tom Nevin in Dublin in 1970 and they were married in Rome in 1976. Within ten years, they owned two houses and managed a pub in Finglas, Dublin. In 1986, they opened Jack White's Inn.

Murder of Tom Nevin
On 19 March 1996, Tom Nevin was killed with a shot from a nine pellet shotgun while counting the day's takings in Jack White's pub near Brittas Bay in County Wicklow. According to Catherine Nevin, she was woken by someone pressing her face into a pillow. She said: "It was a man shouting: 'f**king jewellery, f**king kill ya'. He had a knife in his left hand. Everything in the room was coming down around." IR£13,000 was taken from the pub, and the Nevins' car was stolen and was found abandoned in Dublin.

Prison life
Nevin served her sentence at the Dóchas Centre, Dublin. She lost an appeal in 2003, and in 2010 also lost an application to have her conviction declared a miscarriage of justice.

Nevin in 2016 was diagnosed with a brain tumour and given only months to live by doctors at the Mater Hospital. She received compassionate release in late 2017 and died on 19 February 2018.

References

Irish female murderers
2018 deaths
1950 births
People from County Wicklow
Deaths from brain tumor
Mariticides